Carvalhal is a Portuguese freguesia ("civil parish"), located in Abrantes Municipality, in Santarém District. The population in 2011 was 722, in an area of 17.54 km². Once, the parish population was composed by a large number of woodcutters, due to its location in a densely forested area. However, since the 1980s, the economic importance of the forest has been declining. The zone is usually affected by several wildfires during the summer.

References

Freguesias of Abrantes